The 2005 Asian Women's Volleyball Championship was the thirteenth edition of the Asian Championship, a biennial international volleyball tournament organised by the Asian Volleyball Confederation (AVC) with Chinese Volleyball Association (CVA). The tournament was held in Taicang, China from 1 to 8 September 2005.

Pools composition
The teams are seeded based on their final ranking at the 2003 Asian Women's Volleyball Championship.

Preliminary round

Pool A

|}

|}

Pool B

|}

|}

Classification 9th–12th

Semifinals

|}

11th place

|}

9th place

|}

Final round

Quarterfinals

|}

5th–8th semifinals

|}

Semifinals

|}

7th place

|}

5th place

|}

3rd place

|}

Final

|}

Final standing

Awards
MVP:   Chu Jinling
Best Scorer:  Yelena Pavlova
Best Spiker:   Chu Jinling
Best Blocker:  Lin Chun-yi
Best Server:  Amporn Hyapha
Best Setter:   Feng Kun
Best Digger:  Chen Chia-chi
Best Receiver:   Zhou Suhong

References
AVC
Results
FIVB

V
A
Asian women's volleyball championships
V
2005 in Chinese women's sport